The 1909 season was the 26th season of regional competitive association football in Australia. The Anglo-Australian Football Association introcuded the Victorian Amateur League in the 1909 season.

League competitions

Cup competitions

(Note: figures in parentheses display the club's competition record as winners/runners-up.)

See also
 Soccer in Australia

References

Seasons in Australian soccer
1909 in Australian sport
Australian soccer by year
Australian soccer